Braddock's Battlefield History Center is a small American museum and visitors center on the site of the Battle of the Monongahela of 9 July 1755.

It features a collection of art, documents, and artifacts about the Braddock Expedition and the French and Indian War as it unfolded at the Forks of the Ohio. Located seven miles (10 km) east of downtown Pittsburgh in North Braddock, Pennsylvania, it is housed in a renovated car dealership along with a small gymnastics company on a three-acre parcel on a hillside that overlooks the Monongahela River Valley and the historic Edgar Thomson Works of United States Steel.

The museum was created by Robert T. Messner, a retired Pittsburgh lawyer and grandfather, with the support of local foundations, and it opened to the public on 18 August 2012. In December 2018, Mr. Messner donated the History Center to Fort Ligonier, which will operate the Center beginning in May 2019.

References
Marylynne Pitz (2012). Braddock's Battlefield History Center Opening: story by Pittsburgh Post-Gazette. Retrieved August 20, 2006.

External links
 Braddock's Battlefield History Center website

Museums in Allegheny County, Pennsylvania
Museums established in 2012
2012 establishments in Pennsylvania
History centers
History museums in Pennsylvania
Military and war museums in Pennsylvania
French and Indian War